Nechayevsky is a rural locality (a khutor) in Dondukovskoye Rural Settlement of Giaginsky District, Adygea, Russia. The population was 25 as of 2018. There are 2 streets.

Geography 
Nechayevsky is located 31 km east of Giaginskaya (the district's administrative centre) by road. Smolchev-Malinovsky is the nearest rural locality.

References 

Rural localities in Giaginsky District